Three flats may refer to:
E-flat major, a major musical key with three flats
C minor, a minor musical key with three flats